Milford is a city in Beaver County, Utah, United States. The population was 1,431 at the 2020 census, up from the 2010 figure of 1,409.

History

Although settlers had established ranches in the area in the 1870s, Milford was not developed until after construction of the San Pedro, Los Angeles and Salt Lake Railroad in 1880, which established a station here. Milford is a constructed name, an abbreviated form of mill and ford.

During the Great Depression, workers from a nearby Civilian Conservation Corps camp constructed a road from Milford to Beaver, to improve connections.

Milford Flat Wildfire

Lightning caused a massive wildfire to start near Milford at 3:45 p.m. Friday, July 6, 2007.

Demographics

As of the 2000 census, there were 1,451 people, 484 households, and 357 families residing in the city. The population density was 753.7 people per square mile (290.3/km2). There were 589 housing units at an average density of 306.0 per square mile (117.8/km2). The racial makeup of the city was 90.42% White, 1.45% Native American, 1.45% Asian, 4.07% from other races, and 2.62% from two or more races. Hispanic or Latino of any race were 6.13% of the population.

There were 484 households, out of which 45.0% had children under the age of 18 living with them, 61.0% were married couples living together, 9.3% had a female householder with no husband present, and 26.2% were non-families. 24.0% of all households were made up of individuals, and 14.7% had someone living alone who was 65 years of age or older. The average household size was 2.95 and the average family size was 3.58.

In the city, the population was spread out, with 37.2% under the age of 18, 9.7% from 18 to 24, 23.6% from 25 to 44, 17.2% from 45 to 64, and 12.3% who were 65 years of age or older. The median age was 28 years. For every 100 females, there were 97.4 males. For every 100 females age 18 and over, there were 95.1 males.

The median income for a household in the city was $35,809, and the median income for a family was $41,750. Males had a median income of $35,568 versus $19,000 for females. The per capita income for the city was $14,889. About 9.2% of families and 10.8% of the population were below the poverty line, including 11.1% of those under age 18 and 17.4% of those age 65 or over.

Geography

Milford is located in east-central Beaver County in the Escalante Desert, a basin situated between the Mineral Mountains to the east and the smaller Star Range to the west. State Route 21 passes through the city, leading south  to Minersville and northwest  to U.S. Routes 6 and 50 near the Nevada line. State Route 257 runs north from Milford  to Delta.

Climate

Milford has a semi-arid climate (Köppen BSk).

Historic photo gallery

See also

 List of cities and towns in Utah

References

External links

 

Populated places established in 1880
Cities in Beaver County, Utah
Cities in Utah
1880 establishments in Utah Territory